Mitinskoe Cemetery is a cemetery located in Moscow's North-Western administrative district. It was established on September 15, 1978. A Russian Orthodox church, which was built in 1998, is located on its grounds and has been visited several times by Patriarch Alexius II. The cemetery is the final resting place of firefighters and power plant workers who died while putting out the fires from the Chernobyl disaster, as well as eminent Soviet and Russian cultural, scientific, and military figures (including several Heroes of the Soviet Union and Russian Federation). Olympic Silver Medalist Viktor Logunov (1944–2022) is buried here.

Each year at 10 a.m. on 3 September, crowds gather at the cemetery and light thousands of candles in memory of the victims of the Beslan school hostage crisis.

References

External links 
 Митинское кладбище
 

Cemeteries in Moscow Oblast
Eastern Orthodox cemeteries
Krasnogorsky District, Moscow Oblast
1978 establishments in the Soviet Union